Delta Canis Majoris (Latinised from δ Canis Majoris, abbreviated Delta CMa, δ CMa), officially named Wezen , is a star in the constellation of Canis Major. It is a yellow-white F-type supergiant with an apparent magnitude of +1.83. Since 1943, the spectrum of this star has served as one of the stable anchor points by which other stars are classified.

Observation
Delta Canis Majoris is the third-brightest star in the constellation after Sirius and ε Canis Majoris (Adhara), with an apparent magnitude of +1.83, and is white or yellow-white in colour. Lying about 10 degrees south southeast of Sirius, it only rises to about 11 degrees above the horizon at the latitude of the United Kingdom. The open cluster NGC 2354 is located only 1.3 degrees east of Delta Canis Majoris. As with the rest of Canis Major, Delta Canis Majoris is most visible in winter skies in the northern hemisphere, and summer skies in the southern. In Bayer's Uranometria, it is in the Great Dog's hind quarter.

History and naming
δ Canis Majoris (Latinised to Delta Canis Majoris) is the star's Bayer designation.

The traditional name, Wezen (alternatively Wesen, or Wezea), is derived from the medieval Arabic وزن al-wazn, which means 'weight' in modern Arabic. The name was for one of a pair of stars, the other being Hadar, which has now come to refer to Beta Centauri. It is unclear whether the pair of stars was originally Alpha and Beta Centauri or Alpha and Beta Columbae. In any case, the name was somehow applied to both Delta Canis Majoris and Beta Columbae. Richard Hinckley Allen muses that the name alludes to the difficulty the star has rising above the horizon in the northern hemisphere. Astronomer Jim Kaler has noted the aptness of the traditional name given the star's massive nature.

In 2016, the International Astronomical Union organized a Working Group on Star Names (WGSN) to catalog and standardize proper names for stars. The WGSN's first bulletin of July 2016 included a table of the first two batches of names approved by the WGSN; which included Wezen for this star.

In the catalogue of stars in the Calendarium of Al Achsasi Al Mouakket, this star was designated Thalath al Adzari (تالت ألعذاري - taalit al-aðārii), which was translated into Latin as Tertia Virginum, meaning the third virgin. This star, along with ε Canis Majoris (Adhara), η Canis Majoris (Aludra) and ο2 Canis Majoris (Thanih al Adzari), were Al ʽAdhārā (ألعذاري), the Virgins.

Physical properties

Delta Canis Majoris is a supergiant of class F8 with a radius around 215 times that of the Sun. Its surface temperature is around 5,818 K, and it is 17 times more massive than the Sun. Its absolute magnitude is −6.87, and it lies around 1,600 light-years away. It is rotating at a speed of around 28 km/s, and hence may take a year to rotate fully. Only around 10 million years old, Delta Canis Majoris has stopped fusing hydrogen in its core. Its outer envelope is beginning to expand and cool, and in the next 100,000 years it will become a red supergiant as its core fuses heavier and heavier elements. Once it has an iron core, it will collapse and explode as a supernova.

If Delta Canis Majoris were as close to Earth as Sirius is, it would be as bright as a half-full moon.

Modern legacy
Delta Canis Majoris appears on the flag of Brazil, symbolising the state of Roraima.

References

F-type supergiants
Canis Major
Canis Majoris, Delta
Durchmusterung objects
Canis Majoris, 25
054605
034444
2693
TIC objects
Wezen